Jimmy Dunne (1905–1949) was an Irish professional footballer.

Jimmy Dunne may also refer to:

James Dunne (born 1989), English footballer who plays for Cambridge United
James Dunne (boxer) (1941–2002), British Olympic boxer
James Dunne (Medal of Honor) (1840–1915), American soldier who fought in the American Civil War
James E. Dunne (1882–1942), mayor of Providence 1927–1939
Jimmy Dunne (footballer, born 1935), Irish footballer, son of the above 
Jimmy Dunne (footballer, born 1947), Irish footballer
Jimmy Dunne (footballer, born 1997), Irish footballer
Jimmy Dunne (politician) (1921–1972), Irish politician and trade unionist
Jimmy Dunne (songwriter), American songwriter and recording artist
Jim Dunne (automotive spy photographer), (1931–2019)

See also
James Dunn (disambiguation)